"Weather with You" is a song by Australian-New Zealand rock band Crowded House. It was the third and most successful single released from the group's third studio album, Woodface (1991), reaching top 50 in 10 countries, including the United Kingdom, where it reached number seven. At the APRA Music Awards of 1994, the song won Most Performed Australian Work Overseas. The song was intended to be part of the Finn Brothers' unreleased 1990 debut, but after Capitol Records found the recordings, they were merged with a Crowded House session to become Woodface.

In 1996, Crowded House disbanded, releasing a greatest hits album Recurring Dream in June of that year. "Weather with You" was made the album's first track. Later in the year, the band reunited for one final performance at the Sydney Opera House and performed the song again, calling upon ex-member Tim Finn, who originally performed the song with the group, to join the group onstage. This live performance was not included on the VHS release of the concert, but it was shown on television broadcast and also appeared on the 10-year anniversary DVD entitled Farewell to the World.

Background
On his website, Neil Finn explained:

The first day we got together, we wrote "Weather with You" and [Tim Finn] had the title and the chorus line. 'Everywhere you go you always take the weather with you', and the opening line, 'Walking round the room singing stormy weather'. We started playing that and got the guitar riff going and wrote the whole thing on the first day, so it got off to a good start.

57 Mount Pleasant Street is a fictitious address as far as the number goes, but my sister used to live in a house in Mount Pleasant Road in Auckland and that’s what we were thinking of when we wrote the song. It was just a good contrast to the theme of the song for it to be called Mount Pleasant Street because really it was about a guy who's totally wrapped up in melancholia standing in his lounge room feeling lost.

He went on to say, "Ultimately, the theme of the song is of course, that you are creating your own weather, you are making your own environment, always."

Critical reception
Alan Jones from Music Week complimented the song as "splendid".

Music video
The accompanying music video for "Weather with You" was filmed after Tim Finn's departure. The video, directed by MacGregor Knox (Director of I'm Talking's "Holy Word"), features the remaining members, Neil Finn, Paul Hester and Nick Seymour, at various beaches in Victoria, Australia (including Queenscliff) driving in cars including a Fiat 600 Multipla towing a small "Sports Minor" caravanette and a Ford Thunderbird "Bullet Bird" convertible.

The music video features a slightly rearranged song structure, with a chorus placed before the second verse and some of the instrumental sections shortened.

Legacy
In 2001, "Weather with You" was voted 16th best New Zealand song of all time by APRA and featured on Nature's Best.

Track listings
 UK 7-inch vinyl and cassette
 "Weather with You" (single edit) - 4:17
 "Into Temptation" - 4:35

 Australian and UK CD
 "Weather with You" (single edit) - 4:17
 "Mr. Tambourine Man" (Bob Dylan) (live) - 2:35
 "Eight Miles High" (Gene Clark, Jim McGuinn and David Crosby) (live) - 4:50
 "So You Want to Be a Rock 'n' Roll Star" (Jim McGuinn, Chris Hillman) (live) - 2:49
Note: Live tracks recorded with Roger McGuinn at The Pantages Theater, Los Angeles, 7 April 1989, previously released on "I feel possessed" cd and 12" single.

 Australian and UK alternative CD 
 "Weather with You" (radio edit) - 3:46
 "Fall at Your Feet" (live) - 6:59
 "When You Come" (live) - 6:22
 "Walking on the Spot" (live) - 3:23
Note: Live tracks recorded at The Town & Country Club, London, 9–10 November-1991, exclusive to this release

 Belgian "Rock Torhout Werchter" CD
 "Weather with You" (single edit) – 4:17
 "Into Temptation" (live) – 4:43
 "Don't Dream It's Over" (live) – 4:27
 "Recurring Dream" (original Version) – 2:59
Note: Limited edition. Live tracks recorded at Ancienne Belgique, Brussels, Belgium, 24 February 1992, exclusive to this release.

 Dutch "Outlaw Remixes" CD
 "Weather with You" (Remix full version)
 "Weather with You" (Remix full version without Tim Finn)
 "Weather with You" (Single mix. No breakdown)
 "Weather with You" (Neil Finn's Edit)
Note: The "Outlaw Remixes", mixed at Platinum Studios, Melbourne. Produced and remixed by The Outlaw.

 Japanese CD
 "Weather with You" – 4:02
 "Walking on the Spot" (live) – 4:13
 "Don't Dream It's Over" (live) – 5:53
 "Something So Strong" (live) – 4:02
 "Mr. Tambourine Man" (live) – 2:35
Note: "Walking on the Spot" recorded at The Town & Country Club, London, 10 November 1991 (previously unreleased in Japan); "Don't Dream It's Over" recorded at The Roxy, Los Angeles, 26 February 1987; "Something So Strong" recorded at The Trocadero, Philadelphia, 24 March 1987; "Mr. Tambourine Man" recorded with Roger McGuinn at The Pantages Theater, Los Angeles, 7 April 1989 (however label indicates 7 July 1989 incorrectly).

 US CD single
 "Weather with You" (Radio Edit) - 3:46
 "Walking on the Spot" (live)
 "Don't Dream It's Over" (live)
 "Better Be Home Soon" (live)
 "World Where You Live" (live)
Note: All live tracks recorded at The Town & Country Club, London, England, 9–10 November 1991."Walking on the Spot" was previously unreleased in the US.

Charts and certifications

Weekly charts

Year-end charts

Certifications

Cover versions and live performances
In 2001, Neil and Tim Finn performed the song during the week-long concert series that was captured on the CD/DVD 7 Worlds Collide.

In 2006, Jimmy Buffett covered "Weather with You" and used it as the namesake for his album Take the Weather with You.

In 2009, a re-recorded version featuring Tim, Neil, and Liam Finn appeared on the Tim Finn retrospective North, South, East, West...Anthology.

In 2011, a recording by Hollie Smith was included on the compilation album They Will Have Their Way.

In 2015, the song was included in the soundtrack of the film Everest (2015).

References

Songs about weather
Crowded House songs
1992 singles
1990s ballads
APRA Award winners
ARIA Award-winning songs
Songs written by Neil Finn
Songs written by Tim Finn
Rock ballads
Song recordings produced by Mitchell Froom
1991 songs
Capitol Records singles